The Fellowship of Catholic University Students (FOCUS) is a Catholic outreach program for American college students founded in 1997 by Curtis Martin and Dr. Edward Sri at Benedictine College.

Origin and purpose
FOCUS exists to evangelize. The mission statement of FOCUS is to "Know Christ Jesus and fulfill His great commission." How FOCUS does that is by sending missionaries to college campuses to encounter students and invite them into a lifelong relationship with Jesus. Many students experience profound healing as they give their life over to Jesus, and many join the work of evangelization that the entire world might be saved.

FOCUS established its pilot program in January 1998 at Benedictine College in Atchison, Kansas, with two staff members and 24 students. Curtis Martin discussed the mission of the organization with Pope John Paul II that same year. At the invitation of Archbishop Charles J. Chaput, former archbishop of Denver, a FOCUS program was established in the fall of 1998 at the University of Northern Colorado, Greeley. The group is now headquartered outside of Denver.

FOCUS currently has over 500 full-time staff members. FOCUS takes recent college graduates, trains them in the teachings of the Catholic Church, Scripture and practical aspects of ministry, and sends them out typically in teams of four to serve on college campuses. FOCUS staff members make an initial two-year commitment to this full-time work on campus. FOCUS works with the approval of the local bishop and the support of the local pastor, as well as existing campus ministries.

Operations
The greater part of FOCUS' work occurs in Bible studies, small groups that meet weekly to discuss a passage of Scripture, typically led by a missionary for the organization. The organization calls this small-group model "the method modeled by the master," that is, it purports to base its modes of evangelization off of Jesus' actions in the gospels. FOCUS Bible studies are either all-male or all-female. Meetings generally follow formats and lesson plans distributed by the organization and available online. A Bible study leader will typically meet one-on-one with a couple of select members once a week outside of study sessions in what are called "discipleship" sessions.

Missionaries are typically recent graduates who have some experience with the organization's Bible studies as undergraduates, who dedicate a year or two of service stationed on a campus with a FOCUS program. Missionaries, who make a living by fundraising salaries, undergo a five-week training program at the organization's Denver Support Center the summer prior to their assignments.

Beginning in 1999, FOCUS began to host a series of alternating conferences. The larger of the two, SEEK, is largely educational and social in nature. The smaller, the Student Leadership Summit (SLS), was more directly aimed at training undergraduates and other young and ministerial professionals in the organization's methods. Both conferences feature high-profile speakers, exhibitors, and social events. The organization has hosted conferences since 1999. In 2019, the last SLS was held, with SEEK becoming an annual conference. Due to the COVID-19 pandemic the in person 2021 and 2022 nationwide conferences were cancelled, prompting some universities to join together at a common location to watch the livestreamed talks. In 2023, SEEK was held in person at The Dome at America's Center, where it will return for 2024 (instead of changing locations like past years).

The organization also hosts service trips and retreats scheduled to coincide with typical undergraduate term breaks.

Founder 
Curtis Martin is the founder and CEO of FOCUS. Martin holds a master's degree in Theology and is the author of the best-selling book Made for More, and co-host of the EWTN show Crossing the Goal. In 2004, Curtis and his wife Michaelann were awarded the Benemerenti Medal by Pope John Paul II for their outstanding service to the Church. In 2011, Curtis Martin was appointed as Consulter to the Pontifical Council for Promoting the New Evangelization by Pope Benedict XVI.

Current campuses
As of September 2021, FOCUS serves on 205 campuses with about 800 missionaries. FOCUS is on campuses in 41 states, and they also have a presence at the University of Vienna in Austria, University of Southampton in England, Dublin, Ireland, and the University of Passau and the University of Dusseldorf in Germany.

See also 

Catholic spirituality
Life Teen
Universal call to holiness
Vocational Discernment in the Catholic Church
World Youth Day

References

External links
Official website
Article on FOCUS

Christian organizations established in 1998
Catholic student organizations